James Edward Washington Jr. (born April 2, 1996) is an American football wide receiver who is a free agent. He played college football at Oklahoma State, where he won the Fred Biletnikoff Award and named a unanimous All-American in 2017 before being drafted by the Pittsburgh Steelers in the second round of the 2018 NFL Draft.

Early years
Washington attended Stamford High School in Stamford, Texas. As a senior, he had 73 receptions for 1,331 yards and 24 touchdowns as a receiver and 42 tackles and seven interceptions on defense. He committed to Oklahoma State University to play college football. Washington also played tennis, basketball and ran track in high school.

College career
As a true freshman at Oklahoma State in 2014, Washington played in all 13 games and had 28 receptions for 456 yards and six touchdowns. Playing in all 13 games again as a sophomore in 2015 he recorded 53 receptions for 1,087 and 10 touchdowns. As a junior in 2016, he had 71 receptions for 1,380 yards and 10 touchdowns. He was named Offensive MVP of the 2016 Alamo Bowl after recording nine receptions for 171 yards and a touchdown. Washington returned to Oklahoma State for his senior year, rather than enter the 2017 NFL Draft. In 2017 Washington won the Biletnikoff Award for the nation's best wide receiver.

College statistics

Professional career
On December 11, 2017, it was announced that Washington had accepted his invitation to play in the 2018 Senior Bowl. Washington impressed scouts and analysts during practices in preparation for the Senior Bowl. On January 27, 2018, Washington played in the 2018 Reese's Senior Bowl, but finished without a catch as a part of Houston Texans head coach Bill O'Brien's South team that defeated the North 45–16. Throughout the game he was covered by Jacksonville State's Siran Neal. He attended the NFL Scouting Combine in Indianapolis and completed all of the combine and positional drills. He finished 14th among all wide receivers in the short shuttle. On March 15, 2018, Washington participated at Oklahoma State's pro day and performed the 40-yard dash (4.50s), 20-yard dash (2.70s), 10-yard dash (1.61s), vertical jump (39"), and broad jump (10'2"). He also attended a pre-draft visit with the Dallas Cowboys. At the conclusion of the pre-draft process, Washington was projected to be a third round pick by NFL draft experts and scouts. He was ranked the seventh best wide receiver prospect in the draft by Scouts Inc. and was ranked the ninth best wide receiver by DraftScout.com.

Pittsburgh Steelers
The Pittsburgh Steelers selected Washington in the second round (60th overall) of the 2018 NFL Draft. He was the seventh wide receiver taken in the draft. His Oklahoma State teammate, quarterback Mason Rudolph, was selected by the Steelers in the third round (76th overall).

2018
On May 12, 2018, the Pittsburgh Steelers signed Washington to a four-year, $4.50 million contract that includes a signing bonus of $1.35 million. In the Steelers' Week 2 loss to the Kansas City Chiefs, Washington recorded his first professional reception, which was a 14-yard touchdown. Washington finished his rookie season with 16 receptions for 217 yards and one touchdown.

2019

In Week 10 against the Los Angeles Rams, Washington caught a season high six passes for 90 yards and his first touchdown of the season in the 17–12 win. In Week 12 against the Cincinnati Bengals, Washington caught three passes for 98 yards including a 79-yard touchdown in the 16–10 win. During Week 13 against the Cleveland Browns, Washington finished with 111 receiving yards on four receptions, including a 30-yard touchdown, as the Steelers won 20-13. Overall, Washington finished the 2019 season with 44 receptions for 735 receiving yards and three receiving touchdowns.

2020
Washington was placed on the reserve/COVID-19 list by the Steelers on August 2, 2020, and was activated five days later.
In Week 1 against the New York Giants, Washington caught 2 passes for 34 yards and his first receiving touchdown of the season during the 26–16 win. In Week 6 against the Cleveland Browns, Washington caught 4 passes for 68 yards and a receiving touchdown in a blowout 38-7 win.

Dallas Cowboys
On March 18, 2022, Washington signed a one-year contract with the Dallas Cowboys. During training camp, Washington was carted off the practice field after suffering a fractured fifth metatarsal. He was placed on injured reserve on August 31, 2022. He was activated from injured reserve on December 10, 2022. He was released on January 4, 2023.

New York Giants
The New York Giants signed Washington to their practice squad on January 11, 2023.  His practice squad contract with the team expired after the season on January 21, 2023.

NFL career statistics

Regular season

Postseason

References

External links
Oklahoma State Cowboys bio
Pittsburgh Steelers bio

1996 births
Living people
Players of American football from Texas
Sportspeople from Abilene, Texas
People from Stamford, Texas
American football wide receivers
Oklahoma State Cowboys football players
All-American college football players
Pittsburgh Steelers players
Dallas Cowboys players
New York Giants players